The Duplex is a comic strip by Glenn McCoy and now his brother Gary McCoy, syndicated by Universal Press Syndicate/Universal Uclick/Andrews McMeel Syndication since April 1993.

The Duplex has been published as a syndicated daily newspaper comic strip and on the internet. Although designed for American readers, The Duplex enjoys popularity outside the USA.

Characters 
The characters of The Duplex include:

 Eno L. Camino, the main character
 Fang, Eno's dog and best friend
 Gina, Eno's and Fang's neighbor
 Mitzi, Gina's poodle and Fang's object of affection
 Elvin, Eno's neighbor and friend

Awards 
In 2005, the National Cartoonists Society gave The Duplex the award for 2004's best Newspaper Comic Strip.

Books 
Two collections of strips have been published:

References

External links 
 

1993 comics debuts
Comics characters introduced in 1993
American comic strips
Gag-a-day comics
Comics about dogs